Barringer Hill is a geological and mineralogical site in central Texas. The hill consists of a pegmatite and geologically, lies near the eastern edge of the Central Mineral Region in the Texas Hill Country. It is named for John Baringer, who discovered in it large amounts of gadolinite about 1887 (Hess).

Geology and history
The Barringer (Baringer) pegmatite was discovered in 1887 and, until its disappearance beneath the water of Lake Buchanan in 1937, was one of the most significant places in America from a mineralogical standpoint. Described by the United States Geological Survey as one of the greatest deposits of rare-earth minerals in the world, the pegmatite was the first place geologists discovered fergusonite, thorogummite, yttrialite, and nivenite. The pegmatite is centrally located in the Lone Grove pluton, a 1.6 Ga old rapakivi granite, intruded into Valley Spring Gneiss. Geologic evidence suggests the pluton's emplacement as a rather shallow intrusion of magma, possibly in a sub-caldera type situation. An original depth of five to seven kilometers may be assumed for the present level of exposure (Denney). Hess describes the intrusion being surrounded by a graphic granite of peculiar beauty and definite structure, being more like a text-book illustration. Within the white bands were found fluid inclusions and bubbles that moved only slowly when the specimen was tilted. Between these bands the quartz is glassy and clear. At one place a vug was found large enough for a man to enter, lined with smoky quartz crystals reaching  or more in weight.

Of the 47 minerals discovered at Barringer Hill, gadolinite, a radioactive form of yttria, triggered the most interest at the time. This greenish-black ore had previously only been found in small amounts in Russia and Norway. Because of its economic potential as a material for light filaments, both Thomas Edison and George Westinghouse attempted to obtain the hill, with the Piedmont Mining Company, which was owned by Edison, winning out in 1889. In 1903, German chemist Walther Nernst, who later became famous for discovering the Third Law of Thermodynamics, was working for Westinghouse when he developed a street light that used raw gadolinite as a filament. The mineral species rich in yttrium-erbium were more particularly sought after because thorium and uranium were not used in the "glower" of the Nernst lamp. The Nernst Lamp Company, a subsidy of Westinghouse, then bought Barringer Hill and began mining, extracting a few hundred pounds of yttria minerals annually for a few years. Eventually, Nernst Lamp Company ceased operations as newer technologies surpassed the lamp. It was apparently free from alteration, had specific gravity of 4.28 (taken on a very pure fragment), had a bright green chatoyancy at certain angles, and was like glass in its broad obsidian-like conchoidal fracture.

Masses of coarsely crystallized fluorite up to  weight were not rare, and some of these had very large faces of the cube and rhombic dodecahedron. Its color varied from dark green to puce and purple, and colorless transparent rough crystals having remarkably perfect cleavage were sometimes observed. Some of the fluorite was true chlorophane and exhibited a brilliant green light when strongly heated and viewed in the dark. One mass was self-luminous, at night, without heating it. Enormous crystals of orthoclase were common, some over five feet in diameter. Quite frequently small veins of very perfect red feldspar crystals (highly twinned), and upon which albite crystals were attached, were found bordering the fluorite and penetrating it. In the feldspar, well crystallized menaccanite was sometimes observed. Yellow rutile, of the sagenitic variety, was observed in only one instance and then upon smoky quartz crystals. Polycrase, or an allied species, was seen implanted upon the gadolinite. Very fair amethysts were found in the west end of the hill, in cavities in the feldspar. Masses of biotite, four feet across, were met with and always indicated the presence near-by of the rare-earth minerals. Of particular note were the unusually long radial lines projecting in many directions from the bodies of ore richest in thorium, uranium and zirconium. Hidden named these occurrences "stars" and eagerly sought for them, as positive "pointers" to ore. At one point he noted a redness of skin and burning sensation when mining these, that he attributed to radioactivity, which was poorly understood at the time.

Mineral specimens from Baringer Hill eventually found their way into collections across the country, including the Houston Museum of Natural Science, the American Museum of Natural History in New York, Harvard University, and the University of Texas at Austin.

In Music
The song, "Ragged Wood" by the band Fleet Foxes, references the site with the lyrics saying, "Lie to me if you will/at the top of Barringer Hill".

References

Denney, JH and Volker, GW, The Geological Society of America, Annual Meeting, Guidebook Field Trip 13, San Antonio, 1986.
Hess, F. L., Minerals of the rare-earth metals at Baringer Hill, Llano County, Texas: U.S. Geol. Survey Bull. 340, pp. 286–294, 1908.
Hess, F. L., The Baringer Hill pegmatite dike: Science, vol.27, p. 537, 1908. 
Hidden, W. E., Some results of late mineral research in Llano County, Tex. Am Jour. Sci., 4th ser., vol. 19, No. 114 - June 1905, pp. 425–433. 
Landes, K. K., The Baringer Hill, Texas, Pegmatite: Amer. Min., vol. 17, pp. 381–390, 1932. 
Fry, Tillie Badu Moss, A history of Llano County, Texas. Thesis, University of Texas at Austin, 1943 
Yarbrough, C.L., Canyon of the Eagles: A History of Lake Buchanan and Official Guide to the Vanishing Texas River Cruise, 1989.

External links
E-Rock: Virtual Trip to Enchanted Rock

Mineralogy
Geology of Texas
Geography of Llano County, Texas